Hsu Ming-chun (born 21 September 1965) is a Taiwanese politician. She is currently the Minister of Labor since 26 February 2018.

Education
Hsu obtained her bachelor's degree in law from National Taiwan University in 1987. She passed her bar examination soon afterwards within the same year.

Early career
In 1990, she opened her law firm in southern Taiwan. In 2006, she became the lawyer for Kaohsiung Mayor Chen Chu to fight against a lawsuit filed by Chu's opponent claiming that her Kaohsiung mayoralty election in December 2006 was invalid.

Political career
Hsu was the Director of Information Department of Kaohsiung City Government in 2008-2009 and the Director-General of Legal Affairs Bureau of the city government in 2009–2013. In October 2016, Hsu was appointed as the Deputy Mayor of Kaohsiung and served the position until February 2018.

Ministry of Labor
On 26 February 2018, Hsu was appointed to be the Minister of Labor in a handover ceremony from her predecessor Lin Mei-chu who had tendered her resignation earlier on citing health issues. The ceremony was witnessed by Minister without Portfolio Lin Wan-i. Upon her appointment, she vowed to fully implement the labor law and protect the rights of workers.

References

Living people
Taiwanese Ministers of Labor
Women government ministers of Taiwan
Government ministers of Taiwan
Taiwanese women lawyers
National Taiwan University alumni
1965 births